This is a list of lists related to Omaha, Nebraska.

Lists 
 List of people
 List of landmarks
 List of cemeteries
 List of neighborhoods
 List of mayors
 List of Registered Historic Places in Douglas County
 List of people from North Omaha
 List of hospitals
 List of parks
 List of founding figures
 List of print media
 List of other media
 List of radio stations
 List of television stations
 List of churches
 List of synagogues
 List of streets
 List of public schools
 List of riots and civil unrest
 List of trails
 List of historic companies
 List of tallest buildings
 List of companies
 List of colleges and universities
 List of African-American historic places
 List of museums and cultural institutions

Timelines 

 Timeline of Omaha history
 Timeline of racial tension
 Timeline of North Omaha history